The Hawiye is the largest Somali clan family. Members of this clan traditionally inhabit central and southern Somalia, Somaliland, Djibouti, Ethiopia (Somali, Harar, Oromia and Afar regions) and Kenya (North Eastern Province, Eastern Province). They are also the majority in the capital city, Mogadishu.

Origins 
Like the great majority of Somali clans, the Hawiye trace their ancestry to Aqil ibn Abi Talib, a cousin of the prophet Muhammad and an older brother of Ali ibn Abi Talib and Ja'far ibn Abi Talib. They trace their lineage to Aqil through Samaale (the source of the name 'Somali'), the purported forefather of the northern pastoralist clans such as the Hawiye, the Dir, and –matrilineally through the Dir– the Isaq and the Darod. Although these genealogical claims are historically untenable, they do reflect the longstanding cultural contacts between Somalia (especially, though not exclusively, its most northern part Somaliland) and Southern Arabia.

Distribution

With the arrival of Samaale in the areas of Somaliland, the Hawiye further crossed into Ethiopia, said to be the traditional homeland, before descending along the Shabelle Valley.

In Somalia, the Hawiye clans in Somalia can today be found inhabiting areas of fertile lands in the Shabelle River of Beledweyne in the Hiran region and Jowhar in the Middle Shabelle region and stretching from the coast immediately south of Mogadishu to the north of the ancient port town of Hobyo in the desert central Mudug region. The Abgaal and the Hawadle sub-clans of Hawiye are the majority in the Hirshabelle state of Somalia, while in Galmudug the Habar Gidir are the majority followed by other Hawiye clans such as Abgaal, Duduble and Murusade. The Hawiye also have a second majority presence in the Lower Shabelle region. They can also be found in Jubbaland and the Bay and Bakool region. The Fiqishini subclan of the Habar Gidir inhabit the Sool region of Somaliland. 

The Hawiye also live in their traditional birthplace, Ethiopia and hold a sizeable population in the Somali Region of Ethiopia as well as cities like Babile and Imi in the Oromia regions. In the southern parts of the Somali Region, Hawiye are majority in 2 of the 9 zones, namely the Liben zone and the Shabelle. The Hawiye are also present in the other zones such as the Dollo, Jarar and the Jigjiga zone. A small number can also be found in the Afar region.

In Kenya, Hawiye can also be found in the North Eastern Province (Kenya) region of Kenya where the Degoodi sub-clan is 3rd majority out of Somali clans in Kenya and the majority in the Wajir region, followed by another Hawiye sub-clan, the Ajuran and then the Murule who are the majority of the Mandera region as shown in the Kenyan census.

Major Hawiye cities include the capital of Somalia, Mogadishu, Beledweyne, Jowhar and Mandera.

Role and Influence in Somalia
  The Hawiye have historically played an important role in Somalia. The majority of Somalia's founding fathers hailed from the Hawiye. The first President, Prime Minister and the father of the Somali Military were all Hawiye. Aden Adde the first President was Udeejeen. The first Prime Minister Abdullahi Issa was Habar Gidir. The father of the Somali Military Daud Abdulle Hirsi was Abgaal. Since then the Hawiye have produced five more Presidents and four more Prime Ministers.

The Hawiye figure prominently in many important fields of Somali society, including the Business and Media sector. For example, Abdirahman Yabarow, the editor-in-chief of VOA Somali is kin. Yusuf Garaad Omar who was the Chairman of BBC Somali for over a decade and helped pioneer its rise during his tenure, is also a member. As are the heads of major national corporations - Jubba Airways and Hormuud Telecom.

Currently the Hawiye play a leading role in the regions of Galmudug, Hirshabelle and Benadir (Mogadishu), but also Somalia as a whole.

History
According to the 12th-century author Al-Idrisi, the Hawiye clan occupied the coastal areas between Ras Hafun and Merca, as well as the lower basin of the lower Shabelle river. Al-Idrisi's mention of the Hawiye is the first documentary reference to a specific Somali group in the Horn of Africa. Later Arab writers also make references to the Hawiye clan in connection with both Merca and the lower Shabelle valley. Ibn Sa'id (1214–74), for instance, considered Merca to be the capital of the Hawiye, who lived in fifty villages on the bank of a river which he called "the nile of Mogadishu, a clear reference to the Shabelle river.

One must mention the Hawīya and Garğēda who are also represented as clan families or clans among the Somali. Both groups seem to have been long established in the Sultanate of Bale: the early immigrants from Merca started from a Hawiya-occupied region and oral traditions relate the Garğēda with the time of the "holy war" in the 1530s. 

Along with Rahanweyn, the Hawiye clan also came under the Ajuran Empire control in the 13th century that governed much of southern Somalia and eastern Ethiopia, with its domain extending from Hobyo in the north, to Qelafo in the west, to Kismayo in the south.

In these places and period of time, known to medieval writers as the Ajan Coast or côte d'Ajan, Harold Marcus also credits the leading role of the Hawiye in islamizing the communities of what is now southeast Ethiopia and southern Somalia during the 15th and 16th centuries.

Since sections of the Hawiyya were migrating southward before and during Gragn's jihad, it is not inconceivable that they brought certain theocratic notions with them. Indeed, the Ajuran maintained a wakil (governor) in the region around Qallafo. This area was not only the traditional Hawiyya homeland, but also stood midway geographically between the emirates of Harar and the Benaadir, an ideal link for the transmission of political and religious ideas.

Enrico Cerulli, an Author on key Somali social development and early history, mentions the following passage on the birth and succession of the Ajuran Sultanate.

The oral sources also provide us with recurrent themes that point to certain structural features of Ajuran rule. The descendants of the Ajuraan (among which are the Gareen imams) can therefore be understood to have inherited the spiritual (Islamic)  and the secular (numerical) power provided by the alliance of the first three Hawiyya “brothers”.  Ajuran power reposed on the twin pillars of spiritual preeminence and Hawiyya kinship solidarity, a potent combination in the Somali cultural context. In historical terms, a theocratic ideology superimposed on an extensive network of Hawiyya-affiliated clans helped uphold Ajuran dominance over a wide region. The Darandoolle, it should be noted, were part of the Gurqaate, a clan section collateral to the Jambelle Hawiyya from whom Ajuran (and Gareen) is said to have been descended. Intermarriage among the descedants of these uterine brothers on the one hand helped reinforce the solidarity of the Hawiyya. On the other hand, competition between collateral lines was very common in Somalia, particularly where the titular leadership of a larger clan-confederation was at stake. Such a struggle for the dominant place within the Hawiyya-dominated Ajuran confederation may also be reflected in the rise of the Silcis and El Amir  in the later years of Ajuran rule. Both are said to have been descedants of Gurqaate Hawiyya, as were the Abgaal Darandoolle. Thus it can be argued that the dominant groups which appeared toward the end of the Ajuran era—the Darandoolle near Muqdisho, the Silcis near Afgooye, and the El Amir in Marka—represent the partition of the Ajuran imamate among collateral Hawiyya sections. Or perhaps one branch of the Hawiyya—namely the Gurqaate—forcibly replaced another (the Jambelle) as leaders of the clan.

The Hiraab Imamate was the main successor state of Ajuran Sultanate. The reason for their rebellion was the Ajuran rulers, in the end, became extremely prideful, neglected the sharia law, and imposed a heavy tax on their subjects which was the main reason for the rebellion. Other groups would follow in the rebellion which would eventually bring down Ajuran rule in the inter-riverine region and Benadir coast.

Lee Cassanelli in his book, The Shaping of Somali society, provides a historical picture of the Hiraab Imamate. He writes:

"According to local oral tradition, the Hiraab imamate was a powerful alliance of closely related groups who shared a common lineage under the Gorgaarte clan divisions. It successfully revolted against the Ajuran Empire and established an independent rule for at least two centuries from the seventeen hundreds and onwards.

The alliance involved the army leaders and advisors of the Habar Gidir and Duduble, a Fiqhi/Qadi of Sheekhaal, and the Imam was reserved for the Mudulood branch who is believed to have been the first born. Once established, the Imamate ruled the territories from the Shabeelle valley, the Benaadir provinces, the Mareeg areas all the way to the arid lands of Mudug, whilst the ancient port of Hobyo emerged as the commercial center and Mogadishu being its capital for the newly established Hiraab Imamate in the late 17th century.

Hobyo served as a prosperous commercial centre for the Imamate.  The agricultural centres of El Dher and Harardhere included the production of sorghum and beans, supplementing with herds of camels, cattle, goats and sheep. Livestock, hides and skin, whilst the aromatic woods and raisins were the primary exports as rice, other foodstuffs and clothes were imported. Merchants looking for exotic goods came to Hobyo to buy textiles, precious metals and pearls.  The commercial goods harvested along the Shabelle river were brought to Hobyo for trade. Also, the increasing importance and rapid settlement of more southerly cities such as Mogadishu further boosted the prosperity of Hobyo, as more and more ships made their way down the Somali coast and stopped in Hobyo to trade and replenish their supplies.

The economy of the Hawiye includes the predominant nomadic pastoralism, and to some extent, cultivation within agricultural settlements in the riverine area, as well as mercantile commerce along the urban coast. At various points throughout history, trade of modern and ancient commodities by the Hawiye through maritime routes included cattle skin, slaves, ivory and ambergris.

Soon afterwards, the entire region was snapped up by the fascists Italians and it led to the birth of a Modern Somalia. However, the Hiraab hereditary leadership has remained intact up to this day and enjoys a dominant influence in national Somali affairs."

Clan tree
There is no clear agreement on the clan and sub-clan structures and many lineages are omitted. Ali Jimale Ahmed outlines his genealogical clan tree of the Hawiye in The Invention of Somalia.

Samaale
Irir
Hawiye
Karanle
Kaariye Karanle
Gidir Karanle   
Seexawle Karanle
Baad
Murusade 
Sabti
Abakar Sabti
Abdalle Sabti
Habar Idinle
Foorculus
Habar Ceyno
Daguuro
Hilibi
Gugundhabe 
Baadicade
Afgaab
Maamiye
Subeer
Saransoor
Gaaljecel
Caloofi
Makaahil
Dirisame
Barsane
Degoodi
Fai
Jibrail
Jidle alias Murule 
Nacabsoor
Sharmarke
Jajeele
Faqay
Yacqub
Gorgaarte
Hiraab
Mudulood
Wacdaan
Maalinle
Samakaay
Moobleen
Udeejeen
Aden Yacqub
Xersi Macalin
Abgaal
Harti
Agoonyar 
Warsangeli
Owbakar
Wacbuudhan
Daud
Isaaq Daud
Yusuf Daud
Galmaax
Maxamed Muuse
Mataan Cabdulle
Celi Cumar
Abdulle Galmaax
Kabaale
Saleeban Muuse
Xeyle Muuse
Waceysle 
Cali Gaaf
Yabadhaale
Aadan Maxacade
Macalin Dhiblaawe
Eybakar Gaab
Maxaa Cade
Absuge Qombor
Duduble
Maxamed Camal
Maqlisame
Owradeen
Sheekhaal
Loobage
Maxamed Cagane
Qudub
Abdiraxiin Martiile
Habar Gidir
Sacad
Reer Ayaanle
Reer Hilowle
Reer Jalaf
Saleebaan
Reer Warfaa
Reer Muuse
Bah-Abgaal
Cayr
Ayaanle
Cabsiiye
Habar Eji
Saruur
Nabadwaa
Wadalaan
Silcis
Hawadle
Ali Madaxweyne
Yabar Madaxweyne
Ibrahim Ciise
Abdi Yusuf
Agoon Abdalle 
Jambeelle
Hintire
Ajuuraan
Gareen
Waalamage
Xaskul
Owsaan
Raaranle Hawiye

NOTE The Xawaadle, Saransoor (Gaaljecel, Dagoodi, Ciise, Masarre, Tuuf Garre) and Ajuuraan are historically counted as Hawiye lineages under Gorgaarte, Gugundhabe and Jambeelle respectively. The Sheekhaal are similarly said to be descendants of Hiraab.

Notable Hawiye figures

Rulers
 Sheikh Hussein, 13th Century Muslim Saint of East Africa and Ruler of the Sultanate of Bale
 Ahmad ibn Ibrahim al-Ghazi nicknamed "Ahmed Gurey", Somali Imam and General of the Adal Sultanate, Ruler of Harar and Conqueror of Ethiopia
Caaqil Dheryodhoobe, Legendary Warrior Chief of Central Somalia and Strategic Thinker
 Sheikh Hassan Barsane, Religious and National Anti Colonial leader
 Olol Dinle, Last Sultan of the Ajuran Sultanate
Ahmed Gabyow, Somali Patriot and War Poet of the Benadir Coast

Politicians
 Abdullahi Issa, Prime Minister of Somalia, 1956–1960
 Aden Abdullah Osman Daar, President of Somalia, 1960–1967
 Haji Farah Ali Omar, Deputy Prime Minister and Foreign Affairs Minister  of Somalia, 1967–1969
 Hussein Kulmiye Afrah, Vice President of Somalia, 1971–1990
 Mohamed Ibrahim Liqliiqato, President of the National Assembly, 1982–1989
 Ali Mahdi Muhammad, President of Somalia, 1991–2000
 Abdiqasim Salad Hassan, President of Somalia, 2000–2004
 Ali Mohammed Ghedi, Prime Minister of Somalia, 2004–2007
 Nur Hassan Hussein, Prime Minister of Somalia, 2007–2009
 Sharif Ahmed, President of Somalia, 2009–2012
 Hassan Sheikh Mohamud, President of Somalia, 2012–2017, 2022–Current
 Hassan Ali Khaire, Prime Minister of Somalia, 2017–2020
 Mohamed Hussein Roble, Prime Minister of Somalia, 2020–2021
 Sheikh Ali Jimale, Cabinet Minister, First Opposition Party Secretary-General and Runners Up in the 1961 Presidential Elections 
 Abdullahi Ahmed Addow, Governor of the Central Bank, Minister of Economic Affairs, later Somali Ambassador to the United States 1970–1980
 Mohamed Sheikh Osman, Former Minister of Finance, Commerce and Industry 
 Omar Hassan Mohamud "Istarliin", 1960s Mayor of Mogadishu and Chairman of the Somali Rebellion SODAF
 Ali Mohamed Osoble "Wardhigley", MP Elected from Mogadishu, Minister of Information, Health and Labour, Vice Chairman of SNM, Chairman of USC
 Mohamed Afrah Qanyare, Politician, Businessman, Chairman of the Alliance for the Restoration of Peace and Counter-Terrorism (ARPCT) 
 Abukar Umar Adani, Islamist, Tycoon, Owner of the El-Ma`an Port which served as Mogadishu's temporary Port since its closure in 1995
 Abdullahi Mohamed Ali "Sanbaloolshe", Politician, Diplomat, Secretary of State for National Security and Intelligence Chief (NISA)
 Shaaban Ali Issack, Former Member of Kenyan National Assembly/Parliament, Assistant Minister for Urban Development, 1995–2007
 Hassan Mohamed Hussein Mungab, Mayor of Mogadishu, Chief of the Somali Supreme Court, 2012–2016
 Mohamed Nur, Popular Mayor of Mogadishu, 2009–2012, famously nicknamed Tarzan
 Mohamed Hussein Ali, Former Member of Kenyan National Assembly/Parliament, 2007-2013

Military personnel
 Daud Abdulle Hirsi, First Commander-In-Chief of the Somali National Forces in 1960, Commanding Officer of the 1964 Ethiopian–Somali Border War
 Salaad Gabeyre Kediye, Brigadier General, Father of the 1969 Kacaan  Revolution
 General Mohamed Farrah Aidid, Chairman of the United Somali Congress that toppled Dictator Siad Barre, battled US Delta forces and UNOSOM during Operation Restore Hope and a self-declared President of Somalia before his Death, 1987–1996
Mohamud Barre Faytaan, First Chief of the Somali Air Defence Corps and later Somali Airlines
Mohamed Ali Dhagaxtuur, SYL Horseed Militia leader, Martyr of the 1948 Four-Power Commission Hanoolaato riots in Mogadishu named after the Dhagaxtuur Monument
Osman Sheikh Mao, First Commander of the Somali Navy
 Colonel Ahmed Maxamed Xasan, Award Winner fighter jet pilot who famously refused government orders to bomb Somaliland in the lead up to the Civil War, 1988–1991
 Abdi Hasan Awale Qeybdiid, Longest reigning Police Commissioner, dubbed Tiger Abdi in the infamous Black Hawk Down
 Hassan Dahir Aweys, Decorated Colonel of the Ogaden War, Founder of the Islamic Courts Union
 Mohamed Abdi Hassan, Entrepreneur, Somalia's "Pirate Kingpin" who captured the MV Sirius Star Ship, 2008

Leading intellectuals
 Hussein Sheikh Ahmed Kaddare, Linguist, Author of the 1952 Kaddariya script
 Ismail Jim'ale Osoble, Human Rights Lawyer, Journalist, Cabinet Minister, Author of the 1990 Somali Manifesto
 Abdulkadir Yahya Ali, Peace Activist, Founder of the Center for Research and Dialogue
Elmi Ahmed Duale, Director General of Somali Public Health, World Health Organization East Africa Programme Coordinator, Permanent Representative of Somalia to the United Nations
 Ahmed Mumin Warfa, Senior Government Advisor, Philanthropist, Scientist and Rector of the Zamzam University of Science and Technology, discovered the Cyclamen somalense species
 Farah Weheliye Addo, Politician, Chairman of the Somali Football Association, Council for East and Central Africa Football Associations, Somali Olympic Committee and Vice-President of the African Football Confederation (CAF)
 Yusuf Garaad Omar, Editor-in-Chief of the BBC Somali Service
 Abdi Mohamed Ulusso, Writer, Historian, 2004 Presidential Candidate
 Ali Jimale, Educator at the City University of New York
 Ali Sheikh Ahmed, Dual President of Mogadishu University and Al-Islaah
 Elman Ali Ahmed, Entrepreneur and Social Activist
 Hilowle Imam Omar, Chairman of the Somali Civil War Reconciliation Program
 Ibrahim Hassan Addou, Former Professor of Washington University, Foreign Minister of the Islamic Courts Union in 2006
 Hussein Ali Shido, SYL Politician, Ambassador and later founding member of the United Somali Congress

Music and literature
 Abdi Bashiir Indhobuur, Poet and Composer
 Abdulle Geedannaar, Poet
 Hasan Adan Samatar, Famous Musician in the 1970s and 1980s
 K'naan, Somali-Canadian Poet, Rapper and Musician
 Magool (Halima Khalif Omar), Musician

Political factions and organizations
 Alliance for the Restoration of Peace and Counter-Terrorism (ARPCT) a Somali alliance created by various faction leaders and entrepreneurs
 Hizbul Shabaab, the Youth Movement wing of the ICU before ceding the organisation to Aden Hashi Farah "Eyrow"
 Islamic Courts Union (ICU), a rival administration to the Transitional Federal Government.
 Juba Valley Alliance (JVA), primary opponent of the Somali Patriotic Movement
 Somali National Alliance (SNA), formed by Mohamed Farrah Aidid
 Somali Salvation Army (SSA), the Ali Mahdi Muhammad branch of the United Somali Congress
 United Somali Congress (USC), formed in 1987, played a leading role in the ouster of the dictatorship

See also
 Somali aristocratic and court titles

References

Sources

 
Somali clans in Ethiopia